Kırıkhanspor is a Turkish football club located in Kırıkhan, Hatay Province.

League participations 
TFF Third League: 1984–1989, 1991–1994, 2009–2018
Turkish Regional Amateur League: 2018–2019
Amateur League: –1984, 1989–1991, 1994–2009, 2019–

League performances 

Source: TFF: Kırıkhanspor

Current squad
 2013/2014 squad.
Last update: 9 April 2014

References

External links 
Kırıkhanspor on TFF.org

TFF Third League clubs
Football clubs in Hatay
Association football clubs established in 1938
Defunct football clubs in Turkey
1938 establishments in Turkey
Association football clubs disestablished in 2022
2022 disestablishments in Turkey